Stelis uncinata is a species of orchid plant and is native to Costa Rica.

References 

uncinata
Flora of Costa Rica